2-Hydroxyisobutyric acid is the organic compound with the formula .  A white solid, it is classified as an hydroxycarboxylic acid.  It has been considered as a naturally occurring precursor to polyesters.  It is closely related to lactic acid.

Occurrences
The enzyme 2-hydroxyisobutyryl coenzyme A (CoA) mutase isomerizes 3-hydroxybutyryl coenzyme A into 2-hydroxyisobutyryl coenzyme A.  Hydrolysis of the latter gives 2-hydroxyisobutyric acid.

The amides formed from this carboxylic acid and the ε-amino group of lysine residues are a kind of post translational modification.

Ethyl methacrylate (an industrially important monomer methacrylic acid) was first obtained by treating the ethyl ester of 2-hydroxyisobutyric acid with phosphorus pentachloride in an apparent dehydration reaction.

References

Alpha hydroxy acids